Solome Balungi Bossa (also Solomy Balungi Bossa), (born 14 April 1956), is a Ugandan judge on the International Criminal Court (ICC). Prior to her election to the ICC, she was a member of the Court of Appeal in Uganda, which also doubles as the Constitutional Court in the Judiciary of Uganda.  She was elected to a nine-year term on 5 December 2017 and was sworn in on 9 March 2018.  Previously she was appointed to a six-year term on the African Court on Human and Peoples' Rights in 2014.

Early life and education
Solome Bossa was born on 14 April 1956 in Nsambya Hospital, in Uganda's capital city of Kampala. Her father, Stanley Walusimbi Ssesanga, was a lawyer and her mother was a housewife.  

Bossa attended Ugandan schools for her primary and secondary school education.  In 1976, she was admitted to Makerere University, in Kampala, to study law. She graduated with a Bachelor of Laws (LLB) degree in 1979.  She obtained a Diploma in Legal Practice from the Law Development Centre in Kampala. In 1987, she obtained a Certificate in Law Reporting, from the Commonwealth Youth Centre, in Lusaka, Zambia.  Later, in 2016, she was awarded a Master of Laws (LLM) degree, by the University of London, specializing in Public International Law.

Activism
Bossa has been a human rights activist since 1980 and founded non-profit organisation including the East African Centre for Constitutional Development, the Uganda Network on HIV, AIDS, Ethics and the Law and the Uganda Law Society.

Career
Bossa was a lecturer at the Law Development Centre of Uganda from 1981 until 1997. She was a legal practitioner from 1988 until 1997, representing indigent women and expanding legal aid, including serving as president of the Uganda Law Society.  

She served as Judge at the Uganda High Court from 1997 until 2013. Bossa was a member of the East African Court of Justice for five years, from 2001 until 2006. She was a member of the International Criminal Tribunal for Rwanda (UNICTR) from 2003 until 2013.  Bossa was a judge on the East African Court of Justice from 2001 until 2006 and on the International Criminal Tribunal for Rwanda from 2003 until 2013. She was appointed to the Ugandan Constitutional Court in 2013. In 2014, Bossa was elected Judge of the African Court on Human and Peoples’ Rights, for a six-year term. 

In 2014, Bossa was one of the judges who annulled Uganda's Anti-Homosexuality Act for not being passed with the required quorum.  She received death threats on social media.

In 2017, Bossa became a nominee for the International Criminal Court and was elected later that year.

Other activities
 International Commission of Jurists, Member
 International Association of Women Judges, Member
 East African Judges and Magistrate Association, Member
 National Association of Women Judges, Member
 Uganda Association of Judges and Magistrates, Member

Personal life
Bossa is married to Joseph Bossa, a lawyer and Uganda People's Congress politician, since 1981.  She is the mother of four children.

Publications

See also
 Julia Sebutinde

References

External links
Demolish Wall, KCC Tells Justice Bossa
International Association of Women Judges profile and video

1956 births
Living people
Ganda people
Makerere University alumni
Law Development Centre alumni
Academic staff of the Law Development Centre
Alumni of the University of London
International Criminal Court judges
Ugandan women judges
People from Central Region, Uganda
East African Court of Justice judges
International Criminal Tribunal for Rwanda judges
Judges of the African Court on Human and Peoples' Rights
Justices of the Court of Appeal of Uganda
People educated at Makerere College School
20th-century Ugandan women
21st-century Ugandan women
Ugandan judges of United Nations courts and tribunals
Ugandan judges of international courts and tribunals